The 2004–05 New Jersey Devils season was the 31st season for the National Hockey League franchise that was established on June 11, 1974, and 23rd season since the franchise relocated from Colorado prior to the 1982–83 NHL season. However, the 2004–05 NHL lockout prevented the season's games from occurring.

NHL lockout
Devils general manager Lou Lamoriello sat on the negotiating committee for the league, although he had little to say early on in the proceedings.  However, he was invited to a January meeting by the players' union in an attempt to breach sides; Lamoriello was invited because of the respect for the manner in which he ran the Devils organization.  That meeting was ultimately unfruitful, although it did lead to further talks between the players and the owners.  As late as February 2005, Lamoriello showed hope the season could be salvaged. 

He later added:

Lamoriello praised the final decision, saying it put everyone on "level footing" and created more parity in the league.

Meanwhile, during the stoppage Devils' center Scott Gomez went home to Anchorage, Alaska to play for the Alaska Aces of the ECHL.  He went on to lead the league in scoring, netting 86 points in only 68 games, en route to winning the league's Most Valuable Player award.

Schedule
The Devils regular season schedule was announced on July 14, 2004. Their preseason schedule was announced on July 19, 2004.

|-
| 1 || September 28 || New York Rangers
|-
| 2 || September 30 || @ New York Rangers
|-
| 3 || October 1 || @ New York Islanders
|-
| 4 || October 6 || @ Philadelphia Flyers
|-
| 5 || October 8 || New York Islanders
|-
| 6 || October 9 || Philadelphia Flyers
|-

|-
| 1 || October 15 || Toronto Maple Leafs
|-
| 2 || October 16 || @ Buffalo Sabres
|-
| 3 || October 20 || New York Islanders
|-
| 4 || October 23 || Detroit Red Wings
|-
| 5 || October 26 || @ New York Islanders
|-
| 6 || October 29 || St. Louis Blues
|-
| 7 || October 30 || @ Ottawa Senators
|-
| 8 || November 2 || @ Philadelphia Flyers
|-
| 9 || November 3 || @ Washington Capitals
|-
| 10 || November 6 || Tampa Bay Lightning
|-
| 11 || November 8 || @ Atlanta Thrashers
|-
| 12 || November 10 || Nashville Predators
|-
| 13 || November 12 || Dallas Stars
|-
| 14 || November 13 || @ Washington Capitals
|-
| 15 || November 16 || Ottawa Senators
|-
| 16 || November 18 || Toronto Maple Leafs
|-
| 17 || November 20 || Pittsburgh Penguins
|-
| 18 || November 22 || @ Pittsburgh Penguins
|-
| 19 || November 24 || @ Florida Panthers
|-
| 20 || November 26 || @ Tampa Bay Lightning
|-
| 21 || November 27 || Atlanta Thrashers
|-
| 22 || December 1 || New York Rangers
|-
| 23 || December 3 || Montreal Canadiens
|-
| 24 || December 4 || @ New York Rangers
|-
| 25 || December 7 || Buffalo Sabres
|-
| 26 || December 9 || @ Minnesota Wild
|-
| 27 || December 11 || New York Rangers
|-
| 28 || December 12 || @ Chicago Blackhawks
|-
| 29 || December 15 || Tampa Bay Lightning
|-
| 30 || December 17 || Montreal Canadiens
|-
| 31 || December 18 || @ Montreal Canadiens
|-
| 32 || December 21 || @ Carolina Hurricanes
|-
| 33 || December 23 || New York Islanders
|-
| 34 || December 27 || @ Florida Panthers
|-
| 35 || December 29 || @ Tampa Bay Lightning
|-
| 36 || December 31 || Anaheim Mighty Ducks
|-
| 37 || January 4 || Atlanta Thrashers
|-
| 38 || January 6 || @ New York Islanders
|-
| 39 || January 8 || @ Toronto Maple Leafs
|-
| 40 || January 10 || Minnesota Wild
|-
| 41 || January 12 || Colorado Avalanche
|-
| 42 || January 14 || Boston Bruins
|-
| 43 || January 15 || @ Boston Bruins
|-
| 44 || January 18 || Philadelphia Flyers
|-
| 45 || January 20 || @ New York Rangers
|-
| 46 || January 22 || Carolina Hurricanes
|-
| 47 || January 25 || @ Vancouver Canucks
|-
| 48 || January 28 || @ Edmonton Oilers
|-
| 49 || January 29 || @ Calgary Flames
|-
| 50 || February 2 || Los Angeles Kings
|-
| 51 || February 3 || @ Buffalo Sabres
|-
| 52 || February 5 || @ Philadelphia Flyers
|-
| 53 || February 8 || Florida Panthers
|-
| 54 || February 10 || New York Rangers
|-
| 55 || February 15 || Pittsburgh Penguins
|-
| 56 || February 17 || @ Philadelphia Flyers
|-
| 57 || February 19 || Carolina Hurricanes
|-
| 58 || February 20 || @ Nashville Predators
|-
| 59 || February 23 || @ Detroit Red Wings
|-
| 60 || February 24 || @ Toronto Maple Leafs
|-
| 61 || February 26 || New York Islanders
|-
| 62 || February 28 || Columbus Blue Jackets
|-
| 63 || March 2 || Boston Bruins
|-
| 64 || March 4 || Washington Capitals
|-
| 65 || March 5 || @ Ottawa Senators
|-
| 66 || March 7 || Philadelphia Flyers
|-
| 67 || March 10 || @ San Jose Sharks
|-
| 68 || March 12 || @ Phoenix Coyotes
|-
| 69 || March 16 || @ New York Rangers
|-
| 70 || March 17 || Atlanta Thrashers
|-
| 71 || March 19 || Philadelphia Flyers
|-
| 72 || March 21 || Buffalo Sabres
|-
| 73 || March 24 || @ Pittsburgh Penguins
|-
| 74 || March 26 || @ New York Islanders
|-
| 75 || March 27 || Pittsburgh Penguins
|-
| 76 || March 29 || Ottawa Senators
|-
| 77 || March 31 || @ Carolina Hurricanes
|-
| 78 || April 2 || @ Boston Bruins
|-
| 79 || April 4 || @ Montreal Canadiens
|-
| 80 || April 6 || Florida Panthers
|-
| 81 || April 8 || @ Pittsburgh Penguins
|-
| 82 || April 9 || Washington Capitals
|-

Transactions
The Devils were involved in the following transactions from June 8, 2004, the day after the deciding game of the 2004 Stanley Cup Finals, through February 16, 2005, the day the  season was officially cancelled.

Trades

Players acquired

Players lost

Signings

Draft picks
The Devils' draft picks at the 2004 NHL Entry Draft in Raleigh, North Carolina.

Farm teams
The Albany River Rats, the Devils' American Hockey League affiliate, finished in last place in their division during the 2004–05 AHL season, and failed to make the playoffs for the fifth straight season.  Veteran Dean McAmmond led the team in scoring with 61 points, while right on his heels was hot rookie Zach Parise with 58.  Meanwhile, goaltenders Scott Clemmensen and Ari Ahonen split the load evenly, although Ahonen had more wins in fewer games played.  Parise and Clemmensen would go on to make the Devils' squad full-time the following season.

Notes

References

New Jersey Devils seasons
New Jersey Devils
New Jersey Devils
New Jersey Devils
New Jersey Devils
21st century in East Rutherford, New Jersey
Meadowlands Sports Complex